The Barcoo River in western Queensland, Australia rises on the northern slopes of the Warrego Range, flows in a south-westerly direction and unites with the Thomson River to form Cooper Creek. The first European to see the river was Thomas Mitchell in 1846, who named it Victoria River, believing it to be the same river as that named Victoria River by J. C. Wickham in 1839. It was renamed by Edmund Kennedy after a name supplied by local Aborigines.

The waters of the river flow towards Lake Eyre in central Australia while those of rivers further east join the Murray-Darling basin and reach the sea in South Australia. The river forms a boundary between outback Australia and the "Far Outback"; legend has it that west of the Barcoo there is very little in the way of civilisation.

Tributaries include the Alice River Towns situated on the banks of the Barcoo River include Blackall, Isisford, Tambo and Retreat. The southern boundary of Welford National Park is marked by the Barcoo River and Isisford Weir has been constructed on the Barcoo.

Barcoo grunter
The Barcoo grunter, also known as jade perch (scortum barcoo), is a native Australian freshwater fish found in the eastern Northern Territory rivers of Limmen, Roper, Macarthur; the Barkley Basin, and between the Gilbert River in Northern Queensland and the Lake Eyre drainage of central Australia. Barcoo Grunter is an excellent food fish, and is often farmed in intensive grow-out ponds or tanks in aquaculture.

Disease
The river, or at least the district, also gives its name to several diseases, once widespread in outback Australia but now largely unknown. One is "Barcoo rot", a skin disease, perhaps similar to "desert sore", characterised by crusted impetiginous skin sores and occurring in association with heat, dirt, minor traumas and a diet chronically deficient in fresh fruit and vegetables. A second is "Barcoo fever" in which the sufferer experiences fever, nausea and vomiting which was exacerbated by the sight or smell of food, and constipation. This disease, once common in the outback, has also vanished. It may have been due to drinking water contaminated by cyanobacterial (blue-green algal) toxins. Provision of more reliable food supplies and safer sources of water in the "far Barcoo" may explain why these diseases have now all but disappeared.

The name also appears in the phrase "the Barcoo salute" – brushing the ever-present bush flies from the face with either hand.

Literary references

The Barcoo is mentioned in some poems of Banjo Paterson. 
Examples are in the second stanza of Saltbush Bill and the first stanza of A Bush Christening.

The Barcoo is also referenced in Slim Dusty’s song, “Mad Jack’s Cockatoo”, in the second line of the first verse.

See also

List of rivers of Australia

References

Rivers of Queensland
Lake Eyre basin
Central West Queensland